The Busan Cooperative Fish Market, or BCFM, is the largest fish market in South Korea. It adjoins the South Harbor in Busan.  More than 30% of the country's fish production passes through the market. In recent years, a large percentage of the catch has been made up of yellowtail, due to warming waters in the Sea of Japan. The market occupies an area of 166,420 m2, of which about 10% is a refrigerated working area.

The market first opened on November 1, 1963, at the present-day site of the Busan International Ferry Terminal. It moved to its present location in 1973.

See also
Economy of South Korea
List of markets in South Korea
Fishing industry

References

External links
 http://www.bcfm.co.kr/ Official site 

Fish markets
Retail markets in Busan